The Traveling Saleswoman is a 1950 American Western comedy film directed by Charles Reisner and starring Joan Davis, Andy Devine, Adele Jergens, Joe Sawyer, and Dean Riesner. The film was released by Columbia Pictures on February 15, 1950.

Plot

Cast
Joan Davis as Mabel King
Andy Devine as Waldo
Adele Jergens as Lilly
Joe Sawyer as Cactus Jack
Dean Riesner as Tom
John Cason as Fred
Chief Thundercloud as Running Deer
Victor Adamson as Barfly (uncredited)
Fred Aldrich as Cowpuncher (uncredited)
Stanley Andrews as Dr. Stephen Monroe (uncredited)
Jessie Arnold as Lady Customer (uncredited)
Al Bridge as P. Carter (uncredited)
Ralph Bucko as Townsman (uncredited)
Roy Bucko as Townsman (uncredited)
Robert Cherry as Simon Owen (uncredited)
George Chesebro as Wounded Man (uncredited)
Gertrude Chorre as Squaw (uncredited)
Sonny Chorre as Indian (uncredited)
Heinie Conklin as Man (uncredited)
Victor Cox as Barfly (uncredited)
Charles Vernon David Cypert as Indian (uncredited)
William Monroe Cypert as Indian (uncredited)
Rube Dalroy as Barfly (uncredited)
Jack Evans as Townsman (uncredited)
Herman Hack as Townsman (uncredited)
Charles Halton as Banker Clumhill (uncredited)
Harry Hayden as J.L. King (uncredited)
Teddy Infuhr as Homer Owen (uncredited)
Ethan Laidlaw as Mike Jenkins (uncredited)
Pierce Lyden as Henchman (uncredited)
Emmett Lynn as Desert Rat (uncredited)
Hank Mann as Man in Saloon (uncredited)
Louis Mason as Livery Stable Man (uncredited)
Kermit Maynard as Townsman (uncredited)
George McDonald as Bobby (uncredited)
George Morrell as Man in Saloon (uncredited)
William Newell as Bartender (uncredited)
Frank O'Connor as Townsman (uncredited)
Nick Thompson as Medicine Man (uncredited)
Jack Tornek as Barfly (uncredited)
Harry Tyler as Jasper North (uncredited)
Minerva Urecal as Mrs. Owen (uncredited)
Eddy Waller as Mr. Owen (uncredited)
Blackie Whiteford as Stock Footage Outlaw (uncredited)
Robert J. Wilke as Loser (uncredited)
William Wilkerson as Tony (uncredited)
Harry Woods as Soap Factory Mechanic (uncredited)
Chief Yowlachie as Sam (uncredited)

References

External links

1950s Western (genre) comedy films
American Western (genre) comedy films
1950 films
American black-and-white films
Columbia Pictures films
1950 comedy films
Films directed by Charles Reisner
1950s English-language films
1950s American films